Assassination Classroom: Grand Siege on Koro-sensei is a 2015 action video game developed and published by Bandai Namco Games for the Nintendo 3DS, based on the science fiction comedy manga series Assassination Classroom by Yusei Matsui. The game follows a class of middle school students and their homeroom teacher Koro-sensei, an octopus-like superbeing who the students have been tasked with killing.

Grand Siege on Koro-sensei was released on March 12, 2015, and sold over 25,000 copies in the following few days. The game received a more mixed critical response, with the game being criticized for its gameplay, with praise being directed towards the game's style and humor.

Gameplay 

Assassination Classroom: Grand Siege on Koro-sensei is an action game where players control a middle school student of the Kunugigaoka Junior High School. The game is divided into several different missions, featuring different requirements for the missions to be cleared, although they primarily revolve around defeating the student's homeroom teacher, Koro-sensei, within a given time limit. Defeating Koro-sensei is done via the use of different types of firearms and by setting traps, and placing traps in sequence will produce combos, dealing greater damage. If a trap is triggered at a close range, the player will enter "fever time", allowing Koro-sensei to be rapidly shot.

Certain missions sees the player as Koro-sensei, who has to avoid being defeated by the students through the use of different attacks and moves.

Development and release 
Assassination Classroom: Grand Siege on Koro-sensei was developed and published by Bandai Namco Games. Bandai Namco first became familiar with Assassination Classroom through the development of the fighting game J-Stars Victory VS, which features Koro-sensei as a playable character. The game is an adaptation of the Assassination Classroom manga series created by Yusei Matsui.

The game was first announced in October 2014 via an issue of Weekly Shōnen Jump, which Assassination Classroom was then being serialized in. Further gameplay and release details were unveiled by Bandai Namco through promotional videos and screenshots in the following months. The game was released on March 12, 2015, for the Nintendo 3DS, exclusively in Japan.

Reception and sales 

Grand Siege on Koro-sensei received neutral reception from critics. Famitsu, the most popular video game magazine in Japan, rated the game 25/40 and calculated a normalized rating of 6.3/10, based on 4 of their critics' reviews.

The gameplay of missions received a mixed critical response. Namuko Kushida of Famitsu described the game as an easy-to-play, whereas Tsutsumi, also of Famitsu, opined that he experienced it as difficult to tell which characters have certain abilities, making gameplay feel inprecise. Fellow Famitsu writer Jigoro Ashida enjoyed the game's amount of content, but also wrote that the game started to feel "repetitive" after a while.

The game's general style was met with more favorable reception than the gameplay: Tsutsumi voiced a liking to how the game's traps are reminiscent of the Assassination Classroom manga and anime, describing it as "adorable", and Kushida complimented the game's black comedy style and character animation.

Grand Siege on Koro-sensei sold over 25,000 copies in its first three days of release; by June 2015, the game had sold over 83,000 copies.

Sequel 
On December 14, 2015, Bandai Namco announced a sequel to Grand Siege on Koro-sensei, titled Assassination Classroom: Assassin Training Plan. The sequel was released on March 24, 2016, for the Nintendo 3DS, exclusively in Japan. The game features similar gameplay to the first game with some added features, such as being able to train the game's characters to change their statistics.

Notes

References

External links 
  (archived)

2015 video games
Action video games
Assassination Classroom
Bandai Namco games
Japan-exclusive video games
Multiplayer and single-player video games
Nintendo 3DS games
Nintendo 3DS-only games
School-themed video games
Video games based on anime and manga
Video games developed in Japan
Video games with customizable avatars